Musk sticks are a popular confection in Australia, available from many different suppliers. They consist of a semi-soft stick of fondant, usually pink, and often extruded with a ridged cross-section in the shape of a star. Their flavour and aroma is quite floral, reminiscent of musk perfume. They are also called "musk sweets" and "musk lollies".

The origin of musk sticks is uncertain, probably dating to the early 1900s or a little earlier.  The earliest known written reference is 1927 in the Australian Worker, which talks about the "pink curly musk sticks" from 25 years earlier, which were still available. Total sales are not tracked centrally, but supermarket chain Woolworths is reported as selling about 24 million musk sticks per year.

Opinion about the confection is strongly polarised. ABC News said that "musk sticks manage to disgust tourists as much as they delight Australians", and in October 2018, the Disgusting Food Museum in Malmo, Sweden included musk sticks.

Also available is a fruit-flavoured variant called "Fruit sticks", which look like coloured musk sticks. Musk-flavoured mints are produced by companies such as the Dollar Sweets Company. They are sold through supermarkets under the Dollar Sweets brand and also through Lion Clubs Australia under the Lion Mints brand.

References

External links 

 

Australian confectionery